Thomas Love & Sons was an auctioneer, upholsterer, removers, house furnisher and antique dealer in the 19th, 20th and 21st centuries. Based in Perth, Scotland, it was in business for 140 years, from 1869 to 2009. It had four known locations in Perth during its existence: at 12–19 St John's Place (c. 1900–1960), in Canal Street (1948), in South Street (1960–1970) and in the Fair Maid's House (1965–1966).

The liveries of the company's two-ton Lacre trucks in 1914 listed their services as "Decorations, Furniture, Curtains, Carpets, Bedding".

The company's furniture was listed as being used at Blair Castle in the mid-20th century.

The company became a member of BADA in 1948.

References 

1869 establishments in Scotland
2009 disestablishments in Scotland
Companies based in Perth, Scotland
Antiques dealers
Upholsterers
Scottish auctioneers